The Valdosta Millionaires were a minor league baseball team, based in Valdosta, Georgia from 1913 until 1916. However the team's roots can be traced back to 1906 as the Valdosta Stars of the Georgia State League. The Millionaires became Valdosta's representative in the Empire State League, when it resumed operations in 1913. While the Millionaires claimed first place in the league that season, the second place Thomasville Hornets defeated Valdosta, four games to two, in the best-of-seven series.

In 1914, the league renamed itself the Georgia State League, with the Millionaires representing Valdosta. The circuit started 1915 as the Georgia State League, however it was renamed the Florida–Alabama–Georgia League, which operated inside of Florida, on June 15. In 1916 the team moved to the Dixie League and posted a 25-34 record. After the season ended, the team disbanded.

Seasons

References
Johnson, Lloyd, and Wolff, Miles, editors: The Encyclopedia of Minor League Baseball. Durham, North Carolina: Baseball America, 1997.
Baseball Reference -Valdosta, Georgia

Baseball teams established in 1906
Baseball teams disestablished in 1916
Defunct minor league baseball teams
1906 establishments in Georgia (U.S. state)
Defunct baseball teams in Georgia
Defunct Georgia State League teams